Flame Con is an annual two-day multi-genre entertainment and comic convention, focused on fans and creators of pop culture who are lesbian, gay, bisexual, transgender, and queer (LGBTQ). Launched in 2015, it is the first LGBTQ comic convention in New York City, and the largest LGBTQ comic convention in the world.

Programming
Flame Con is organized by Geeks OUT, a non-profit organization aimed at organizing LGBTQ events at comic conventions. The convention is a multi-genre event, showcasing LGBTQ-inclusive pop culture across comics, graphic novels, anime, manga, video games, movies, and television. Flame Con features panel discussions, workshops, and an exhibitors floor. The convention is launched with an annual kick-off party, which features a dance party and drag performances.

In partnership with the Ali Forney Center, the Sunday of each Flame Con is designated as "Youth Day", in which attendees under the age of 20 are granted free admission.

History
Flame Con launched as a Kickstarter campaign in November 2014, with a fundraising goal of $15,000. The campaign would ultimately raise over $19,000, and was inaugurated as a one-day convention in June 2015. The following year, Flame Con moved from Grand Prospect Hall to the Brooklyn Bridge Marriott, and expanded to two days of programming. 

After the 2016 shooting at Pulse nightclub, Flame Con instituted a ban on all prop weapons at the convention, including those used in cosplay. In 2018, Flame Con relocated from Brooklyn to Manhattan to be held at the Sheraton New York Times Square Hotel. The convention switched to a lottery system to assign exhibitor space in 2019, and launched a mentorship program with artist Jen Bartel that same year. In 2020, Flame Con was cancelled due to the COVID-19 pandemic. An online-online version of the event was held in 2021, and the convention returned to a in-person event in 2022.

Event history

See also
 GaymerX, an LGBTQ-focused video game convention
 ClexaCon, an entertainment convention focused on LGBTQ women

Notes

References

External links 

 Flame Con official website

LGBT conferences
Comics conventions in the United States
Multigenre conventions
Fan conventions
August events
Annual events in New York City
Recurring events established in 2015
2015 establishments in New York City
Conventions in New York City